Franz Freiherr von John (20 November 1815 – 25 May 1876) was an Austrian Feldzeugmeister, Chief of the General Staff, and Minister of War.

Biography

Franz Freiherr von John was born in Bruck an der Leitha as the fourth child of an Austrian officer. He was schooled at the military academy in Wiener Neustadt and joined the Archduke Franz Karl Infantry Regiment Nr. 52 in 1835 as a lieutenant. In 1845 he served as a Lieutenant on the General Quartermaster staff. In 1848 he served under Radetzky as a captain during the First Italian War of Independence where he distinguished himself at Goito.

In 1857 he was promoted to colonel, ennobled as a Baron, and became a regimental commander. In 1859 he was chief of staff of the VI. Army Corps in South Tyrol. In 1861 he was promoted to major general and John became the head of the General Staff of the Italian army commanded by Benedek.

When the Austro-Prussian War started John remained chief of staff of the South Army in Italy under the command of Archduke Albrecht. During the campaign he distinguished himself at the Battle of Custozza (24 June 1866) and was promoted Feldmarshall-Leutnant on the battlefield. After the defeat of Benedek's North Armt at Königgrätz, he accompanied the Archduke to the northern theater of war.

In September 1866 he became Chief of Staff of the Austrian Army (September 1866-March 1869) and in November 1866 he also became Minister of War (Nov. 1866 - Jan. 1868). The same year he was appointed a lifelong member of the House of Lords. As war minister John served in the governments lead by Count Belcredi, Count Beust and Prince Auersperg. During his time as war minister he carried out an army reform based on general conscription.

In December 1868 he became Inhaber of Infanterie Regiment Nr. 76.

In March 1869 he resigned as chief of the general staff and became commanding general in Graz. In 1873 John was promoted to Feldzeugmeister. In 1874 he again became Chief of the General Staff of the army, a post he held until his death in Vienna on 25 May 1876.

Bibliography
 Geoffrey Wawro, The Austro-Prussian War. Austria's war with Prussia and Italy in 1866 (New York 2007), 
 Aus dem Nachlass, Franz Freiherr von John; Karton B/138:1-127 (in drei Kartons verwahrt: 1--68;69–120=Fasz/Teil 1; 121–123,127=Teil2; Kriegsarchiv Wien)
 Werner Hahlweg, Eine Denkshrift des Feldzeugmeisters Franz Freiherrn von John aus dem Jahre 1859 über Adjustierung und Ausrüstung des Infanteristen. In: Zeitschrift für Heeres- und Uniformkunde 67/69 (1934), S. 85–92.
 Johannes Held, Franz Freiherr von John. „Soldat Diplomat Staatsmann“ (PDF; 831 kB). Diplomarbeit, Universität Wien, Mai 2008.

1815 births
1876 deaths
People from Bruck an der Leitha
19th-century Austrian people
Austro-Hungarian generals
People of the Austro-Prussian War
Members of the House of Lords (Austria)
Commanders Cross of the Military Order of Maria Theresa
Theresian Military Academy alumni